

Skiing  
Elena Igorevna Muratova (born December 12, 1986) is a former Russian mogul skier who participated in the 2014 Winter Olympics, won medals at the World Cup, Europe Cup and Russian National Championship.

Career  
Muratova has a degree in sports science and works as a  personal trainer in Canada.  and is the author of

External links
 Muratova's Bio at the International_Ski_Federation.

References 

1986 births
Living people
People from Kirovsk, Murmansk Oblast
Freestyle skiers at the 2014 Winter Olympics
Russian female freestyle skiers
Olympic freestyle skiers of Russia
Sportspeople from Murmansk Oblast